Saint Brendan Church may refer to:

 St. Brendan Catholic Church, Los Angeles, California, USA
 St. Brendan Church in San Francisco, California, USA
 St. Brendan's Church (Bronx, New York), New York, USA
 Saint Brendan the Navigator Church, Columbus, Ohio, USA